Belmesyovo is a rural locality (a settlement) in Barnaul, Altai Krai, Russia. The population was 1,778 as of 2013. There are 98 streets.

Geography 
Belmesyovo is located 21 km south of Barnaul by road. Sibirskaya Dolina is the nearest rural locality.

References 

Rural localities in Barnaul urban okrug